Eugene Antoine (born 8 April 1967) is a Trinidadian cricketer. He played in 25 first-class and 33 List A matches for Trinidad and Tobago from 1990 to 1997.

See also
 List of Trinidadian representative cricketers

References

External links
 

1967 births
Living people
Trinidad and Tobago cricketers